The Way of a Trout with a Fly and Some Further Studies in Minor Tactics  is a fly fishing book written by G. E. M. Skues published in London in 1921.  This was Skues's second book after Minor Tactics of the Chalk Stream (1910).

Synopsis
The Way of a Trout was originally intended to be a treatise on the theory and practice of dressing trout flies but, by Skues's own admission, does not do a very good job of it.  The book does include a number of original and interesting chapters on fly dressing and Skues's theories on the vision of trout.  Additionally, the Minor Tactics section expands on Skues's exploration of nymph fishing for trout.

Reviews

 In Notable Angling Literature (1945) James Robb said of Skues and The Way of a Trout:

 
 He pursued the matter [Nymph fishing] with his striking books The Way of a Trout with the Fly and Nymph Fishing for Chalk Stream Trout.  Mr. Skues is a useful antedote to the extremists who followed Halford and should be read along with that author.  To Mr. G. E. M. Skues anglers are indebted among other things for his particular method of tying as well as for his imitations of nymphs; they are given in his Minor Tactics of the Chalk Stream and The Way of a Trout with the Fly.

 In The Well-Tempered Angler (1965) Arnold Gingrich listed The Way of a Trout as one of the top 30 literary and technical books on fly fishing since the publication of the Treatyse of Fysshynge Wyth an Angle (1496)
Dr. Andrew Herd, noted British fly-fishing historian, characterizes The Way of The Trout:
This is a classic and I often wonder if Skues knew it would be when he set pen to paper. The book is inspirational in a way that Halford's work never was and grips the reader's attention right from the cover, which in the first edition bears the words: ....

The Way of a Trout shows Skues at the height of his powers and it contains the best of his thinking on fishing nymphs and semi-submerged patterns, illustrated by the sort of asides, stories and vast fund of experience that only he could call upon.

In Skues on Trout (2008) Paul Schullery notes:

His second book, which many still regard as a masterpiece, was The Way of a Trout with the Fly (1921), and it quickly established him as one of the day's great angling theorists--as it also established the intellectual and ethical basis for sunken flies as legitimate tools of a well-rounded angler.

Contents
 Foreword - ix
 Division I
 Part I
I. Considerations Of Motive - 1
II. The Why - 3
III. Freewill and Predestination - 5
 Part II
 I. The Sense Of Taste - 8
 II. The Sense Of Smell - 9
 Part III - The Vision Of Trout
 I. A Preliminary Cast - 10
 II. The Sense of Form And Definition - 13
 III. The Invisibility of Hooks - 17
 IV. The Sense of Position - 18
 V. A Problem for The Optician - 20
 VI. The Sense of Number - 23
 VII. The Sense of Colour - 24
 VIII. The Sense of Size - 31
 IX. Tone - 32
 X. In Dusk and Dark - 34
 XI. Looking Upward - 36
 XII. Looking Upward In Dusk and Dark - 43
 Part IV - How
 I. The Mouth of A Trout - 48
 II. A Speculation in Bubbles - 50
 III. The Rise - 51
 IV. Assorted Rises - 59
 V. Fausse Montee - 65
 VI. The Moment - 67
 Part V - What
 I. Flies as Food - 69
 II. Fly Dressing as An Art - 75
 III. Imitation, Representation, Suggestion - 77
 IV. Styles of Fly Dressing - 79
 V. Kick - 82
 VI. Ex Mortua Manu - 83
 Part VI – Bafflement - 89
 Division II - Some Further Minor Tactical Studies
 I. Some Problems - 90
 The Hare's-Ear Puzzle - 90
 Upstream Wind - 91
 A Curious Contrast - 96
 The Red Quill - 100
 The Entrance Out - 102
 The Alder and Canon K. - 104
 The Willow-Fly - 107
 II. Some Fly-Dressing Examples - 108
 Iron Blue - 108
 A Good Small Olive - 109
 July Dun - 110
 Little Red Sedge - 113
 Pheasant Tail - 115
 Rusty Spinner - 117
 The Pope and the Tailers - 118
 III. Some More Fly Dressing—Principles and Practice - 121
 Theories of Wet-Fly Dressing of Trout Flies - 121
 The Dressing of Nymphs - 125
 The Purposes of a Hackle - 129
 The Spade Feather - 132
 Buzz - 133
 A Good Entry - 134
 Quality in Fly-Dressing Materials - 135
 IV. Sundry Observations - 138
 What Made the Dry Fly Possible - 138
 The Excommunication of the Wet Fly - 139
 The Cultivation of Shyness - 149
 Semi-Submerged, Etc. - 154
 Wind and the Evening Rise - 157
 On the Accuracy of Authorities - 161
 Driftweed and Bad Advice - 162
 V. B.W.O. - 166
 B.W.O. - 166
 VI. Tactical - 172
 Glimpses of the Moon - 172
 Side Strain - 176
 Of Pocket Picking - 180
 Of the Ways of Brer Fox - 181
 Picking It off: A Very Minor Tactic - 183
 Argillaceous - 184
 Of Glycerine - 186
 The Switch - 188
 VII. Psychological - 192
 Hands - 192
 Accuracy and Delicacy - I94
 The Triumph of the Inadequate - 196
 VIII. Frankly Immoral - 201
 Makeshift - 201
 IX. Episodical - 205
 Established Principles and Trout - 205
 An Abnormal Day - 208
 One of Life's Little Cast Ironies - 210
 Another of Life's Little Cast Ironies - 212
 A Borrowed Rod - 213
 A Local Fall - 217
 At the Second Culvert - 219
 Bobbing Reed - 224
 Sporting Hazards on a Berkshire Brook - 226
 Four - 232
 Nine to One - 237
 A Travelling Companion - 242
 The Following Day - 246
 My Sticking-Plaster Trout - 252
 X. Doggerel from the Club Journal - 255
 Little Brown Wink - 255
 A Sequel - 257
 Advertisement—Amadou - 260
 ILLUSTRATIONS
I. THE BLUE DUN AS RENDERED IN DIFFERENT SYSTEMS - Frontispiece 
II. Method of Dressing Nymphs - 124
III. Another Method of Dressing Nymphs - 128

Subsequent editions

Further reading

See also
Bibliography of fly fishing

External links
 Online version at the Internet Archive

Notes

1921 non-fiction books
Angling literature
Fly fishing literature
British books
Recreational fishing in the United Kingdom